Severe Tropical Cyclone Rona (JTWC designation: 20P) and Severe Tropical Cyclone Frank (JTWC designation: 22P; RSMC Nadi designation: 16F) were a pair of tropical cyclones that affected Queensland and New Caledonia during the 1998–99 Australian region cyclone season and the 1998–99 South Pacific cyclone season. Over the next couple of days, the low slowly developed further before it was upgraded into a Category 1 cyclone on the Australian intensity scale by the Australian Bureau of Meteorology on 10 February as it started to move towards the southwest. Subsequently, Rona rapidly intensified just before making landfall near the Cape York Peninsula. While the low-level circulation became difficult to locate on 12 February, the upper-level circulation eventually emerged into the Coral Sea and later regenerated into Tropical Cyclone Frank. The system rapidly intensified before making landfall on New Caledonia as a Category 2 cyclone on the Saffir-Simpson Hurricane Scale in the early morning hours of 20 February. Frank was re-classified as an extratropical cyclone the next day.

Seven deaths were reported from Rona and a state of disaster was declared. Over 2,000 fled their homes due to flooding and many residents were caught off-guard for the storm. Significant crop damage was reported. Overall, Rona brought $150 million (1999 USD) in damage to Queensland. Minor damage was reported in New Caledonia. After the season, the name "Rona" was retired from the list of tropical cyclone names.

Meteorological history

At this time strong westerly winds persisted around the northern side of the low, however, a weak pressure gradient and light winds existed to the south of the system and the monsoon trough. This was because of a deep area of low pressure near south-eastern Queensland, had an intense pressure gradient to its south, which prevented the trade winds extending up to the monsoon trough. Throughout 9 February the tropical low moved eastwards under the influence of a middle-to upper-level trough over eastern Australia, however, over the next day the trough dissipated along with the deep area of low pressure. As a result, an area of strong ridging developed to the south of the system, while the trade winds rapidly extended northwards to the monsoon trough. The upper level pattern also became favorable for further development, with an outflow channel forming on the equator-ward side of the system. The low subsequently rapidly intensified during 10 February, with atmospheric convection surrounding the system dramatically improving. The system was subsequently named Rona by the BoM later that day, after it had developed into a category one tropical cyclone on the Australian tropical cyclone intensity scale. At around the same time the United States Joint Typhoon Warning Center (JTWC) initiated advisories and designated the system as Tropical Cyclone 20P, after it had become equivalent to a tropical storm.

After the system had been named the system continued to intensify, and became a category 3 severe tropical cyclone on the Australian scale early on 11 February. The system subsequently moved rapidly west-northwest towards the Queensland coast as the ridge strengthened. The BoM subsequently estimated that the system had peak 10-minute sustained wind speeds of  when it made landfall on the Queensland coast, at around 1300 UTC (2300 EST) on 11 February just to the north of Cow Bay near the mouth of the Daintree River. The system maintained its west-northwest movement as it tracked over land, and according to the BoM maintained cyclone intensity until later that day after it had become difficult to track a definite low level centre. Over the next 24 hours the JTWC continued to track Rona as a tropical cyclone as it moved through the Great Dividing Range. Late on 12 February, the JTWC issued their final advisory on Rona after the system had weakened below cyclone intensity and deep convection, associated with the system had dissipated despite fair upper-level outflow. The JTWC subsequently tracked Rona's remnants into the Gulf of Carpentaria, however over the next few days the BoM tracked the systems remnant low to mid-level circulation as it moved southward.

During 16 February, the system's low to mid-level circulation moved off Queensland's east coast, and tracked eastwards across the Coral Sea within the monsoon trough to the south of the subtropical ridge of high pressure.

Later on 18 February, RSMC Nadi remarked that Tropical Depression 16F had moved east of 160°E and into their area of responsibility. Meanwhile, they also noted that 16F had intensified into a category one tropical cyclone and was thus named Frank. By this time, an upper-level trough over eastern Australia moved into the Tasman Sea. The poleward outflow of Frank improved; as a result, Frank rapidly intensified over the next 24 hours. Frank made landfall near the northern tip of New Caledonia at peak intensity with winds of 145 km/h (90 mph) at 0000 UTC on 20 February. Even though the JTWC operationally assessed the peak intensity at 185 km/h (115 mph), this was lowered to 175 km/h (110 mph) during post-storm analysis.

After making landfall on New Caledonia, Frank maintained peak intensity for 18 hours. Soon afterwards, northwesterly wind shear and cooler sea surface temperatures caused Frank to weaken rapidly. During the morning of 21 February, RSMC Nadi passed warning responsibility to Meteorological Service of New Zealand Limited (TCWC Wellington) as the cyclone had moved south of 25°S. Roughly 18 hours later, Frank merged with a trough to form an intense extratropical cyclone, which eventually made landfall on the South Island of New Zealand near Westport.

Impact and aftermath

Australia
Initially, the system was not considered a major threat to Queensland. A day prior to landfall, the system was only considered a tropical low and was not expecting to intensify. Most residents did not know a powerful storm was coming until four hours before landfall. However, once officials realized that Rona was a serious threat, they started taking precautions. In fact, they feared that if the storm struck at high tide, Townsville would be devastated. All air travel was cancelled about a day before landfall.

The highest rains associated with Rona, were measured at Bellenden Ker in Northern Queensland. Cyclone Rona was responsible for the worst flooding in northern Queensland in 30 years. As a result, 2,000 people fled their homes. Strong winds and flooding caused significant crop and infrastructure damage from Cape Kimberly to Cape Tribulation. In the former, some trees were toppled. Near Daintree, two homes were destroyed, while 12 others were damaged. In addition, a car was crushed by a falling tree. Many workers were unable to get home due to flooding and travel was disrupted throughout the region. In all, seven deaths were attributed to the storm and damage estimates from Cyclone Rona totaled $150 million (1999 USD) in Queensland with roughly $100 million of that coming from crop damage.

On February 12, a disaster area was declared for Cairns and Innisfail due to the severity of damage caused by the storm. Platypuses were spotted along the banks of flooded rivers. Both the names Frank and Rona were retired from the lists of tropical cyclone names after the system had dissipated.

New Caledonia
Cyclone Frank affected two thirds of New Caledonia's Grande Terre island between 20–21 February. Several townships within the north-western parts of the archipelago suffered from power outages, disruption to water supply and telecommunications, while some landslides were reported on coastal roads.

Royal New Zealand Air Force Orion and the Royal Australian Air Force launched a search and rescue mission during 22 February, after three men whose yacht had sunk went missing. The French Navy vessel Jacques Cartier, subsequently picked the sailors up later that day.

See also

 1998–99 Australian region cyclone season
 1998-99 South Pacific cyclone season
 List of wettest tropical cyclones

References

External links

 Queensland cyclone photographs, State Library of Queensland. Includes photographs of the aftermath of Cyclone Rona.

Tropical cyclones in Queensland
Rona
Category 3 Australian region cyclones
F
1998–99 Australian region cyclone season
Retired South Pacific cyclones